The Vilnius metropolitan area (known in Lithuanian as: Vilniaus aglomeracija) is the metropolitan area of Vilnius. The metropolitan area covers two municipalities in the Vilnius County, with an area of 2,530 km2

The largest cities or towns within the metropolitan area are Vilnius, Grigiškės, Nemenčinė and Skaidiškės.

Economy 
In 2020 Vilnius gross metropolitan product was €21.2 billion. This puts Vilnius in 120th place among cities in European Union.

See also 
 List of EU metropolitan areas by GDP

References 

Cities in Vilnius County